The Poncione della Marcia is a mountain of the Swiss Lepontine Alps, looverlooking Brione in the canton of Ticino. It lies at the eastern end the range east of Monte Zucchero, between the Val Redòrta and the Val d'Osura.

References

External links
 Poncione della Marcia on Hikr

Mountains of the Alps
Mountains of Ticino
Lepontine Alps
Mountains of Switzerland